John Styles (17 March 1782 – 22 June 1849) was an English Congregational minister and animal rights writer.

Biography

Styles was educated at Hoxton College. Before the age of 20 he entered the ministry at Newport, Isle of Wight. During his career he was a pastor of independent churches at Brighton, Brixton, Clapham and Foleshill. He was awarded the degree of Doctor of Divinity in 1844 by Aberdeen University.

In 1837, the Society for the Prevention of Cruelty to Animals (SPCA) sponsored an essay competition, with a prize of £100, for the best essay encouraging greater kindness to animals (illustrating "the obligations of humanity as due to the brute creation"). Styles won the competition with his essay The Animal Creation: Its Claims on Our Humanity Stated and Enforced, an early work on animal rights.

Styles based his arguments on Christian principles from the Bible, arguing that animals feel pain and suffer as humans do and that because God has given humans dominion over animals, they should treat them with benevolence and mercy. Historian Anna Feuerstein has noted that "Styles compares humans to a shepherd, positioning animal welfare as pastoral power". The book was positively reviewed in The Herald of Peace and The Monthly Review.

Styles opposed all forms of hunting and vivisection. He was not a vegetarian, but did criticize the luxuries of meat-eating. Historian Rod Preece has suggested that Styles plagiarized from An Essay on Humanity to Animals (1798), by Thomas Young (c.1772–1835) of Trinity College, Cambridge, and that the SPCA jury did not notice the borrowings.

Styles died at Kennington on 22 June 1849.

Selected publications

An Essay on the Character and Influence of the Stage on Morals and Happiness (1807)
An Essay on the Character and Influence of the Stage (1807)
Memoirs of the Life of the Right Hon. George Canning (1828)
The Animal Creation: Its Claims on Our Humanity Stated and Enforced (1839)

See also
John Baxter

References

1782 births
1849 deaths
Anti-vivisectionists
Doctors of Divinity
English animal rights scholars
English Congregationalist ministers